The 2010–11 Saint Kitts and Nevis Premier Division was the 31st season of top-tier football in Saint Kitts and Nevis. The season began on 29 October 2010 and ended in June 2011. Newtown United FC were the defending champions, having won their 15th league championship last season.

This season's competition was held with nine clubs competing, one less than last season. The season will use a triple round robin format instead of a double round robin format for the first stage of the season. At the end of the first stage of the competition, the club in ninth place was relegated to the First Division while the clubs finishing in the top four progressed to the second stage of the competition, called the Final Four. In this stage, each club played against the other three once each. At the end, the top two clubs faced each other for the league championship in a three-legged playoff.

Changes from 2009–10
 The top four teams at the end of the first eight matches would earn a berth into the 2010 Super Mas Cup 
 The top four teams by their second half record would earn a berth into the 2011 Easter Cup

Teams
Clarence Fitzroy Bryant College and Washington Archibald High School FC finished in ninth and tenth place at the end of last season's competition and did not take part in this season's competition. Joining the competition this season were St. Thomas/Trinity Strikers FC.

First stage

Standings

Results

Matches 1–16

Matches 17–24

Final four

Championship playoff
The top two teams at the end of the Final Four will play a best-of-three game series to crown a season champion. The matches took place on 15, 18 and 22 June 2011.

|}

Other competitions

2010 Super Mas Cup
This competition involved the top four teams in the first third of the regular season. The competition took place on 18 and 19 December 2010 at the Newtown Football Stadium.

Semifinals

Third place match

Final

2011 Easter Cup
This competition involved the top four teams in the second third of the regular season. The competition took place on 23 and 24 April 2011 at the Warner Park Sporting Complex.

Semifinals

Third place match

Final

References

External links
Saint Kitts and Nevis FA
Soccerway

Seasons in Saint Kitts and Nevis football
Saint Kitts and Nevis
Premier Division
Premier Division